The little bustard (Tetrax tetrax) is a bird in the bustard family, the only member of the genus Tetrax. The genus name is from Ancient Greek and refers to a gamebird mentioned by Aristophanes and others.

Distribution
It breeds in Southern Europe and in Western and Central Asia. Southernmost European birds are mainly resident, but other populations migrate further south in winter. The central European population once breeding in the grassland of Hungary became extinct several decades ago. The species is declining due to habitat loss throughout its range. It used to breed more widely, for example ranging north to Poland occasionally. It is only a very rare vagrant to Great Britain despite breeding in France.
On 20 December 2013, the Cypriot newspapers 'Fileleftheros' and 'Politis', as well as news website 'SigmaLive', reported the discovery of a dead little bustard in the United Nations Buffer Zone. The bird had been shot by poachers hunting illegally in the zone. The shooting was particularly controversial amongst conservationists and birders since the little bustard is a very rare visitor to Cyprus and had not been officially recorded in Cyprus since December 1979.

Description
In flight, the long wings are extensively white. The breeding male is brown above and white below, with a grey head and a black neck bordered above and below by white.

The female and non-breeding male lack the dramatic neck pattern, and the female is marked darker below than the male. Immature bustards resemble females. Both sexes are usually silent, although the male has a distinctive "raspberry-blowing" call: prrt.

Diet
This species is omnivorous, taking seeds, insects, rodents and reptiles.

Breeding
Like other bustards, the male little bustard has a flamboyant display with foot stamping and leaping in the air. Females lay 3 to 5 eggs on the ground.

Habitat
The bird's habitat is open grassland and undisturbed cultivation, with plants tall enough for cover. Males and females do not differ markedly in habitat selection. It has a stately slow walk, and tends to run when disturbed rather than fly. It is gregarious, especially in winter.

Tracking of male Little Bustards has revealed that they are nocturnal migrants that make frequent stopovers in non-irrigated and irrigated croplands to reach more productive agricultural post-breeding areas.

References

External links

 Oiseaux.net Little bustard photos
 
 
 
 
 
 

little bustard
Birds of Central Asia
Birds of Europe
Near threatened animals
Near threatened biota of Asia
Near threatened biota of Europe
little bustard
little bustard